The Reiter Alpe (also Reiter Alm or Reither Steinberge) is a mountain range of the Berchtesgaden Alps, named after the village Reit. it is located on the German–Austrian border in Bavaria, Germany, and Salzburg, Austria.

Geography
Major peaks include:
 Stadelhorn (2286 m)
 Großes Häuselhorn (2284 m)
 Wagendrischelhorn (2251 m)
 Schottmalhorn (2045 m) 
 Großer Weitschartenkopf (1979 m) 
 Edelweißlahnerkopf (1953 m)
 Ameisnockenkopf (1925 m)

References

External links 

 
Mountain ranges of the Alps
Mountain ranges of Salzburg (state)
Mountain ranges of Bavaria